In Mexico, boxing is considered a major sport, having produced over 200 world champions in professional boxing. Mexico ranks second worldwide between countries with the most boxing world champions.

Boxing in Mexico
Boxing is a particular means of demonstrating rivalry not only between fans of individual boxers, but also between native-born Mexicans, between Mexicans and people of other nations, and between the populations of various Mexican regions.

List of world champions
Note: This list does not include Mexican women world boxing champions such as Jackie Nava. 

 Major Organization
 Undisputed World Championship
 Lineal World Championship

 indicates foreigner-born boxer that represents Mexico due to parent's nationality, residence or other circumstances. indicates foreign boxer of Mexican heritage that doesn't represent Mexico. indicates Mexican-born boxer that represents another nation.

Current titleholders

See also

Sport in Mexico
List of current boxing rankings
List of current world boxing champions
List of boxing triple champions
List of boxing quadruple champions
List of boxing quintuple champions
List of boxing sextuple champions
List of WBA world champions
List of WBC world champions
List of IBF world champions
List of WBO world champions
List of The Ring world champions
List of undisputed world boxing champions

References

Footnotes

Notes

Men's titlists

I:
II:
III:
IV:
V:
VI:
VII:
VIII:
IX:
X:
XI:
XII:
XIII:
XIV:
XV:
XVI:
XVII:
XVIII:
XIX:
XX:
XXI:
XXII:
XXIII:
XXIV:
XXV:
XXVI:
XXVII:
XXVIII:
XXIX:
XXX:
XXXI:
XXXII:
XXXIII:
XXXIV:
XXXV:
XXXVI:
XXXVII:
XXXVIII:
XXXIX:
XL:

External links
 Yahoo! Sports - Boxing
 International Boxing Hall of Fame

world boxing champions, List of Mexican
Mexican world boxing champions, List of

Mexican
Boxing in Mexico